Chris Atkins may refer to:

 Chris Atkins (filmmaker) (born 1976), British journalist and filmmaker
 Christopher Atkins (born 1961), American actor
 Captain Christopher Atkins of HMS Actaeon (1775)

See also
 Chris Akins (born 1976), retired American football player
 Chris Atkin (born 1993), English rugby league player